T. Wynn Rogers (1919–1998) was an American badminton player who won numerous U.S. national titles from the late 1940s to the mid-1960s.

Career
Primarily a doubles player, the tall, rangy Rogers swept all available doubles events (Men’s Doubles, Mixed Doubles, and Senior [age 40+] Men’s Doubles) at the U.S. Open Championships of 1961 and 1962. He was a runner-up in both Men’s Doubles and Mixed Doubles at the prestigious All-England Championships in 1949. Rogers was ranked first in U.S. men's doubles for seventeen consecutive seasons (1948–1964), the last fourteen of these with his longtime partner Joe Alston. He was a leading player on the 1952 U.S. Thomas Cup (men’s international) team which finished second in the then triennial world team competition. In 1956 Rogers was among the initial class of inductees into the U.S. Badminton Hall of Fame, now called the Walk of Fame.

Major achievements

References

American male badminton players
1919 births
1998 deaths